The Criminal Under My Own Hat is an album by T Bone Burnett that was released in 1992. It received a Grammy Award nomination for Best Contemporary Folk Album.

Reception

Music critic Mark Deming of Allmusic praised the album and was "easily T Bone Burnett's strongest album since Proof Through the Night, and a rare pleasure for thinking music fans."

Track listing
All tracks written by T Bone Burnett; except where indicated
 "Over You" – 2:20
 "Tear This Building Down" – 4:37
 "It's Not Too Late" (Burnett, Elvis Costello, Bob Neuwirth) – 4:26
 "Humans from Earth" – 2:48
 "Primitives" – 3:15
 "Criminals" – 3:44
 "Every Little Thing" (Burnette, Neuwirth) – 2:53
 "I Can Explain Everything" – 1:53
 "Any Time at All" – 3:03
 "I Can Explain Everything (Reprise)" – 3:19
 "The Long Time Now" (Burnett, Neuwirth) – 3:00
 "Kill Switch" – 2:55

Personnel
T Bone Burnett – vocals 
Jerry Douglas – dobro 
Edgar Meyer – bowed bass 
Van Dyke Parks – accordion 
Marc Ribot – guitar 
Billy Swan – background vocals  
Jim Keltner – drums 
David Jackson – bowed bass 
Mark O'Connor – mandolin, violin 
Dean Parks – slide guitar 
Jerry Scheff – bass 
Harry Stinson – bass drums  
Andrea Zonn – viola 
Roy Huskey, Jr. – bass

References

1992 albums
T Bone Burnett albums
Albums produced by T Bone Burnett
Columbia Records albums
Albums produced by Bob Neuwirth